Cardiovascular drift (CVD, CVdrift) is the phenomenon where some cardiovascular responses begin a time-dependent change, or "drift", after around 5–10 minutes of exercise in a warm or neutral environment + without an increase in workload. It is characterized by decreases in mean arterial pressure and stroke volume and a parallel increase in heart rate.
It has been shown that a reduction in stroke volume due to dehydration is almost always due to the increase in internal temperature. It is influenced by many factors, most notably the ambient temperature, internal temperature, hydration and the amount of muscle tissue activated during exercise. To promote cooling, blood flow to the skin is increased, resulting in a shift in fluids from blood plasma to the skin tissue. This results in a decrease in pulmonary arterial pressure and reduced stroke volume in the heart. To maintain cardiac output at reduced pressure, the heart rate must be increased.

Effects of cardiovascular drift are mainly focused around a higher rate of perceived effort (RPE); that is, a person will feel like they are expending more energy when they are not.  This creates a mental block that can inhibit performance greatly.

Cardiovascular drift is characterized by a decrease stroke volume and mean arterial pressure during prolonged exercise.  A reduction in stroke volume is the decline in the volume of blood the heart is circulating, reducing the heart’s cardiac output. The stroke volume is reduced due to loss of fluids in the body, reducing the volume of blood in the body. This leads the increase in heart rate to compensate for the reduced cardiac output during exercise. This inefficient cardiac output leads to a decrease in the maximum about of oxygen used by the body – VO2Max. This affects exercise performance by reducing the amount of oxygen that is delivered to the muscles during exercise.

Prevention and Minimalization 
Prevention or minimization of cardiovascular drift includes consistently replacing fluids and maintaining electrolyte balance during exercise, acclimatization to the environment in which one is performing, and weight training[citation needed] to supplement cardiovascular efforts. Fluid intake can reduce cardiovascular drift during periods of sustained exercise, but maintains VO2 max levels. Vascular function and blood pressure can be negatively affected if dehydration occurs. Short term exercise in extreme heat conditions negatively affects VO2 max levels. Exercise over a longer period of time allows the body to acclimate, minimizing cardiovascular drift.

References

 McArdle W., Katch F., Katch V., "Exercise physiology: energy, nutrition, and human performance, Edition 6", Lippincott Williams & Wilkins, 2007
 Cerny F., Burton H., "Exercise physiology for health care professionals", Human Kinetics, 2001
 Kounalakis S., Nassis G., Koskolou M., Geladas N., "The role of active muscle mass on exercise-induced cardiovascular drift", Journal of Sports Science and Medicine, Sept, 2008
 Maher, Maurice. "Cardiac Drift and Ironman Performance." Multisport Solutions. N.p., 24 August 2012. Web. 11 December  2013.
 Coyle EF, González-Alonso J. Cardiovascular drift during prolonged exercise: new perspectives. Exerc Sport Sci Rev. 2001 Apr;29(2):88-92. Review. PubMed .